UFC 218: Holloway vs. Aldo 2 was a mixed martial arts event produced by the Ultimate Fighting Championship that was held on December 2, 2017, at Little Caesars Arena in Detroit, Michigan.

Background
After previously contesting two events in the Metro Detroit area (and the first since UFC 123 in November 2010), the event was the first for the promotion at the newly built venue.

A UFC Featherweight Championship bout between current champion Max Holloway and former UFC Lightweight Champion Frankie Edgar was expected to serve as the main event. However, on November 11, Edgar was forced to withdraw from the fight citing injury. He was replaced by former WEC Featherweight Champion and former two-time champion José Aldo. Aldo was scheduled to face Ricardo Lamas at UFC on Fox: Lawler vs. dos Anjos in a rematch of his successful title defense at UFC 169 in February, 2014. Holloway and Aldo met previously at UFC 212, with the former defeating the latter to win the championship.

A UFC Heavyweight title eliminator bout between former K-1 Grand Prix champion Alistair Overeem and up and coming contender Francis Ngannou co-headlined the event. The winner would be matched against champion  Stipe Miocic for the title. Miocic had previously defeated Overeem by first round knockout at UFC 203 in September 2016.

A flyweight bout between 2008 Olympic gold medalist in freestyle wrestling and former UFC Flyweight Championship challenger Henry Cejudo and Sergio Pettis, initially scheduled for UFC 211 before Cejudo pulled out with a hand injury, was rescheduled for this event. Subsequently, Cejudo's availability for the event was briefly in doubt as he suffered minor burn injuries to his right foot on the evening of October 9 as he was evacuating his hotel as a result of the Tubbs Fire near Santa Rosa, California. The following day, his management team confirmed that the fight with Pettis was still on for the event.

Al Iaquinta was scheduled to face Paul Felder at the event. However, Iaquinta pulled out of the fight on October 31 citing an injury. Felder remained on the card against Charles Oliveira.

Results

Bonus awards
The following fighters were awarded $50,000 bonuses:
Fight of the Night: Eddie Alvarez vs. Justin Gaethje and Yancy Medeiros vs. Alex Oliveira
Performance of the Night: None awarded

See also
List of UFC events
2017 in UFC

References

Ultimate Fighting Championship events
2017 in mixed martial arts
2017 in sports in Michigan
Mixed martial arts in Michigan
Sports competitions in Detroit
UFC 218
Events in Detroit